The YuYu Hakusho manga was written and drawn by Yoshihiro Togashi and was published by Shueisha in the Japanese-language magazine Weekly Shōnen Jump. The series concentrates on the adventures of young delinquent Yusuke Urameshi, who after his death becomes a Spirit Detective, the protector of the Living World against supernatural threats.

The manga consists of 19 tankōbon; the first tankōbon was released on April 10, 1991, and the last one was released on December 2, 1994. An anime adaptation of the series of 112 television episodes was directed by Noriyuki Abe and co-produced by Fuji Television, Yomiko Advertising, and Studio Pierrot. In August 2004, Shueisha released a kanzenban edition. Each kanzenban volume features a new cover. The kanzenban release of the series is 15 volumes long (as opposed to the original 19 tankōbon, each book contains more chapters than the basic editions), with two coming out monthly.

The YuYu Hakusho manga was serialized in North America by Viz Media in the American Shonen Jump magazine. The first volume was released on May 13, 2003, and the last on March 2, 2010. In 2013, Viz Media started to adapt the volumes to a digital format as part of their digital manga releases.


Volume list

References

External links
Official YuYu Hakusho manga site from Viz Media
YuYu Hakusho Kanzenban manga official site  

Chapters
YuYu Hakusho